Michel Bouvard (born 16 January 1958 in Lyon) is a French classical organist.

He is the grandson of composer Jean Henri Antoine Bouvard and studied organ under André Isoir and Suzanne Chaisemartin.

Since 1996, he has been titular organist of the great organ of the Basilica of Saint-Sernin in Toulouse and is also one of three cotitular organists at the Palace of Versailles. He served as the professor of organ at the Conservatoire de Paris from 1995 to 2021, alongside Olivier Latry.

Discography 
 François Couperin: Messe des couvents avec plain-chant baroque alterné
 Sony classical - Organ of Cintegabelle
 Sony classical - Organ of Saint-Maximin
 Johann Sebastian Bach: Clavier-Übung III
 Sony classical - BMG - Orgue Grenzing du CNSM of Lyon
 French authors of the 16th and 17th centuries
 Works by Eustache du Caurroy, Charles Racquet, Louis Couperin... 
 Various pieces
 Chamade - organ of Mesnil-Amelot
 Louis Vierne: Messe solennelle pour 2 orgues et chœur and Pièces de fantaisie
 Charles-Marie Widor: Symphonie romane (written especially for the Basilique Saint-Sernin de Toulouse, a Romanesque basilica that had strongly impressed Widor)
 Tempéraments - Chœur des Éléments - Organ of Saint-Sernin in Toulouse
 Maurice Duruflé: Requiem
 Hortus - Chœur des Éléments - Organ of Notre-Dame du Taur in Toulouse
 Alexandre Pierre François Boëly: 14 préludes sur des cantiques de Denizot.
 Bach: extracts from the Orgelbüchlein.
 Jean Bouvard: 3 Noëls variés
 AOM - Organ of Saint-Jacques in Muret
 "L’orgue Cavaillé-Coll de Saint-Sernin de Toulouse": 
 Works by Charles-Marie Widor, Franz Liszt, César Franck, Louis Vierne
 Éditions Solstice

External links 
 Discography on Discogs
 Michel Bouvard in Recital: 2016 American Guild of Organists National Convention (YouTube)

1958 births
Living people
Musicians from Lyon
French classical organists
French male organists
French performers of early music
French artistic directors
Conservatoire de Paris alumni
Academic staff of the Conservatoire de Paris
Chevaliers of the Ordre des Arts et des Lettres
21st-century organists
21st-century French male musicians
20th-century organists
20th-century French male musicians
Male classical organists